Robert Charles Walton (March 29, 1949 - April 9, 2018) was a Canadian professional ice hockey player in the World Hockey Association (WHA).

Playing career

Rob Walton was drafted in the 1969 NHL Amateur Draft by the Minnesota North Stars of the National Hockey League (NHL). He was taken in the sixth round, 61st overall. Though he was drafted into the NHL, he never played there. He spent most of his career in the minors and World Hockey Association. While in the WHA, he played for the Minnesota Fighting Saints (1973–74), Vancouver Blazers (1973–74 to 1974-75), and Calgary Cowboys (1975–76).

WHA career stats

Games played: 150
Goals: 40
Assists: 71
Points: 111
Penalty minutes: 54

See also
List of WHA seasons
World Hockey Association

References

External links

1949 births
2018 deaths
Calgary Cowboys players
Minnesota Fighting Saints players
Minnesota North Stars draft picks
Niagara Falls Flyers (1960–1972) players
Oshawa Generals players
Peterborough Petes (ice hockey) players
Rochester Americans players
Seattle Totems (WHL) players
Vancouver Blazers players
Canadian ice hockey centres